Clady may refer to:

Clady, County Londonderry, a village in Northern Ireland
Clady, County Tyrone, a small village in Northern Ireland
Clady, County Antrim, a townland in County Antrim, Northern Ireland
Clady, County Armagh, a rural area near Markethill
Clady Circuit, a former motor-cycle racing course in County Antrim, Northern Ireland
Clady River, Co. Donegal, Ireland